Lola is a prefecture located in the Nzérékoré Region of Guinea. The capital is Lola. The prefecture covers an area of 4,688 km.² and has a population of 171,561.

Sub-prefectures
The prefecture is divided administratively into 9 sub-prefectures:
 Lola-Centre
 Bossou
 Foumbadou
 Gama
 Guéassou
 Kokota
 Lain
 N'Zoo
 Tounkarata

Prefectures of Guinea
Nzérékoré Region